Dorsal consonants are consonants articulated with the back of the tongue (the dorsum).  They include the palatal, velar and, in some cases, alveolo-palatal and uvular consonants.  They contrast with coronal consonants, articulated with the flexible front of the tongue, and laryngeal consonants, articulated in the pharyngeal cavity.

Function
The dorsum of the tongue can contact a broad region of the roof of the mouth, from the hard palate (palatal consonants), the flexible velum behind that (velar consonants), to the uvula at the back of the mouth cavity (uvular consonants). These distinctions are not clear cut, and sometimes finer gradations such as pre-palatal, pre-velar, and post-velar will be noted.

Because the tip of the tongue can curl back to also contact the hard palate for retroflex consonants (subapical-palatal), consonants produced by contact between the dorsum and the palate are sometimes called dorso-palatal.

Examples

See also
Place of articulation
List of phonetics topics

References

Place of articulation